Jung jin-ho (Hangul: 정진호, Hanja: 鄭振浩; born 2 October 1988) is a retired South Korean professional baseball outfielder. His major position was right field, though he sometimes played as center fielder or left fielder. 

He graduated from Chung-Ang University and was selected by the Doosan Bears in the 2011 draft (2nd draft, 5th round). 

On 7 June 2017, Jung hit for the 23rd cycle in KBO League history against the Samsung Lions. He is the first player to hit for the cycle in the KBO's minimum innings (5 innings). On 1 May 2018, he hit the 84th inside-the-park home run in KBO history; he did this against the KT Wiz.

References

External links 
 Career statistics and player information from Korea Baseball Organization
 Jung Jin-ho at Doosan Bears Baseball Club

1988 births
Living people
Baseball players from Seoul
South Korean baseball players
Doosan Bears players
Hanwha Eagles players
KBO League outfielders
Chung-Ang University alumni